Anita Cifra (born 6 August 1989 in Békés) is a Hungarian handballer who plays for Vasas SC as a line player. She is also a Hungarian international, having made her debut on 6 March 2009 against Sweden.

Achievements
Nemzeti Bajnokság I:
Winner: 2015
Silver Medalist: 2012, 2013, 2014
Magyar Kupa:
Bronze Medalist: 2010
EHF Cup Winners' Cup:
Winner: 2012

References

External links
 Anita Cifra career statistics at Worldhandball

1989 births
Living people
People from Békés
Hungarian female handball players
Békéscsabai Előre NKSE players
Sportspeople from Békés County